Siyka Kelbecheva (born 1 December 1951) is a Bulgarian rower and Olympic champion.

She became Olympic champion in 1976 in the coxless pair, with Stoyanka Kurbatova-Gruicheva. She received a bronze medal in 1980.

References

1951 births
Living people
Bulgarian female rowers
Rowers at the 1976 Summer Olympics
Rowers at the 1980 Summer Olympics
Olympic gold medalists for Bulgaria
Olympic bronze medalists for Bulgaria
Olympic medalists in rowing
People from Smolyan Province
Medalists at the 1980 Summer Olympics
Medalists at the 1976 Summer Olympics